The Great Adventure is a 1974 Argentine action film comedy directed by Emilio Vieyra. The film stars Víctor Bó, Graciela Alfano and Ricardo Bauleo. The film marked the end of Vieyra's contract with  Pel-Mex, and start of collaboration with producers Aries Cinematográfica Argentina and other small producers. The film features a Dollars trilogy-type whistling and gun-firing score.

Cast

Graciela Alfano as Afrodita
Ricardo Bauleo as Apolo
Víctor Bó as Hércules
Leonardo Bonzi
Juan José Camero
Florencio Alegre
María Fernanda Cartier
Rey Charol
Julio De Grazia
Noemí del Castillo
Beto Gianola
Alberto Golán
Liliana Lagos
Juan Carlos Landers
Roberto Landers
Stella Maris Lanzani
Ricardo Lavié
Maria Estela Lorca
Gilda Lousek
Oscar Maril
Jorge Martínez
Enrique Milio
Guillermo Murray
Arturo Noal
Enrique Nóbili
Ignacio Quirós
Gigi Rua
Dudy Sicorski
Julieta Vertier
Emilio Vieyra as Cameo
Norberto Vieyra

Reception
Although the director Emilio Vieyra was often criticized and his films dismissed by critics, The Great Adventure was a commercial success and considered a "blockbuster". Fernando Gabriel Varea in his 2006 book El cine argentino durante la dictadura militar, 1976/1983 described the film as a "super super adventure", "sort of cross between James Bond and the Three Stooges".
 The Great Adventure'' was also the first of several of Vieyra's films which featured fish and dolphins.

References

External links
 
 

1974 films
1970s Spanish-language films
1970s action films
Argentine action films
1970s Argentine films
Films directed by Emilio Vieyra